The CS 30 is a Canadian sailboat, that was designed by Tony Castro and first built in 1984. The design is out of production.

Production
The boat was built by Canadian Sailcraft in Canada. It became their most successful model, with 90 built the first year and 500 completed over the whole production run from 1984-1990.

Design

The CS 30 is a small recreational keelboat, built predominantly of fibreglass, with wood trim. It has a masthead sloop rig, an internally-mounted spade-type rudder, reverse transom and a fixed fin keel. It displaces  and carries  of ballast.

The winged keel version of the boat has a PHRF racing average handicap of 156 with a high of 185 and low of 144.

Operational history

In a review Michael McGoldrick wrote, "The CS 30 was introduced in the mid 1980s, and it was an immediate hit with sailors who had outgrown their 26 and 27 footers. It is a newer design which features a fairly long waterline, a wide transom, and double spreaders. And while it doesn't quite have an enclosed aft cabin, it comes very close with a large aft double berth ... Approximately five hundred CS 30s were built during the latter half of the 1980s. Unlike the large windows illustrated on line drawings, many of these appear to have been built with 8 smaller opening ports (similar to what is found on the CS 36 Traditional)."

See also

List of sailing boat types

Similar sailboats
Alberg 30
Alberg Odyssey 30
Aloha 30
Annie 30
Bahama 30
Bristol 29.9
Cal 9.2 
C&C 1/2 Ton
C&C 30
C&C 30 Redwing
Catalina 30
Catalina 309
Grampian 30
Hunter 29.5
Hunter 30
Hunter 30T
Hunter 30-2
Hunter 306
J/30
Kirby 30
Leigh 30
Mirage 30
Mirage 30 SX
Nonsuch 30
O'Day 30
Pearson 303
S2 9.2
Santana 30/30
Seafarer 30
Southern Cross 28
Tanzer 31

References

External links

Keelboats
1980s sailboat type designs
Sailing yachts
Sailboat type designs by Tony Castro
Sailboat types built by CS Yachts